Order of the Montenegrin Grand Star is the second highest state order of Montenegro.
The order is awarded by the President of Montenegro. 

It is awarded for special merits in developing and strengthening cooperation and friendly relations between the Republic of Montenegro and other countries and international organizations and for contributing to the international reputation and influence of Montenegro.

Notable recipients
 2018 -  Joe Biden
 2018 -  Mike Turner
 2018 -  John McCain
 2016 -  Miroslav Lajčák
 2015 -  Queen Rania of Jordan
 2015 -  Khalid bin Abdulaziz Al Saud
 2015 -  Zoran Đinđić (posthumously)
 2013 -  Mohamed bin Zayed Al Nahyan
 2010 -  Khalid bin Faisal Al Saud

See also 
 Orders, decorations, and medals of Montenegro

References

Awards established in 2006